Shandor Alphonso is a Canadian ice hockey linesman, currently working in the National Hockey League. He has worn sweater number 52 since joining the NHL prior to the start of the 2014-15 season.

Playing career
Alphonso was chosen in the 7th round (140th overall) of the 2000 OHL Priority Selection, by the Sudbury Wolves. He spent three seasons with Sudbury, picking up 73 points in 183 games. After spending the 2004–05 season in the OPJHL, he played five years at Lakehead University before finishing his playing career in the WOAA with the Shelburne Muskies.

Officiating career
Prior to the 2009-10 season, Alphonso attended the NHL's Amateur Exposure Combine, a program for former junior and college players who had an interest in becoming an official. He decided to become an official, instead of continuing his playing career.

On 25 September 2011, Alphonso worked his first Ontario Hockey League game in Oshawa, as the Sault Ste. Marie Greyhounds played against the Oshawa Generals.

He attended the combine again (then called the Officials Exposure Combine), in 2014, before signing a minor league contract that September. His first NHL game came on 17 October 2014, when the Florida Panthers faced off against the Buffalo Sabres in Buffalo. In 2015 (his first season under the contract), he worked the American Hockey League's Calder Cup final series between the Utica Comets and Manchester Monarchs.

Before the 2016-17 season, Alphonso was promoted to a full-time NHL linesman.

On 14 February 2017, Alphonso was slashed in the leg by Anaheim Ducks centre Antoine Vermette, who was reportedly unhappy with a faceoff conducted by Alphonso. Alphonso did not suffer any injury on the play, but Vermette was assessed a game misconduct and was suspended 10 games by the league the next day.

Personal life
Before he joined the NHL's officiating staff in 2014, Alphonso had worked for RBC Bank as a financial planner. He left the company in October of that same year.

References

External links

1984 births
Living people
Canadian ice hockey officials
Ice hockey people from Ontario
National Hockey League officials
People from Orangeville, Ontario
Sudbury Wolves players